Jane Ranum (born August 21, 1947) is an American politician who served in the Minnesota Senate from 1991 to 2007.

References

1947 births
Living people
Politicians from Charlotte, North Carolina
Democratic Party Minnesota state senators
Women state legislators in Minnesota